Piz Val Müra is a mountain of the Albula Alps, located east of Piz Kesch in the canton of Graubünden.

The closest localities are Zuoz and Madulain.

References

External links
 Piz Val Müra on Hikr

Mountains of the Alps
Alpine three-thousanders
Mountains of Switzerland
Mountains of Graubünden
Madulain
Zuoz